Nationality words link to articles with information on the nation's poetry or literature (for instance, Irish or France).

Events
 January 6 – Pablo Neruda speaks out in the Senate of Chile against political repression and is forced into hiding.
 Summer – Composer Richard Strauss sets three short poems by Hermann Hesse to music; they become part of his valedictory Four Last Songs, his final works before his death in 1949.
 September 17 – The remains of Irish poet W. B. Yeats (who died at Menton, France in 1939) are re-buried at Drumcliffe, County Sligo, "Under bare Ben Bulben's head", having been moved from the original burial place, Roquebrune-Cap-Martin, on Irish Naval Service corvette LÉ Macha. His grave at Drumcliffe, with an epitaph from "Under Ben Bulben", one of his final poems ("Cast a cold Eye / On Life, on Death. / Horseman, pass by"), becomes a place of literary pilgrimage
 Sometime this year, Jack Kerouac introduces the phrase Beat Generation to describe his friends and as a general term describing the underground, anti-conformist youth gathering in New York at this time to the novelist John Clellon Holmes
 Di Goldene Keyt, an Israeli literary quarterly, is founded
 The Bollingen Prize is established by Paul Mellon, funded by a $10,000 grant from the Bollingen Foundation to the Library of Congress.

Works published in English
Listed by nation where the work was first published and again by the poet's native land, if different; substantially revised works listed separately:

Canada
 Earle Birney, The Strait of Anian. Toronto: Ryerson Press.
 Roy Daniels, Deeper into the Forest
 Robert Finch, The Strength of the Hills
 A. M. Klein, The Rocking Chair and Other Poems. Governor General's Award 1948.
 Irving Layton, Now Is The Place: Stories and Poems. Montreal: First Statement Press.
 Douglas Le Pan, The Wounded Prince
 L. A. MacKay, The Ill-Tempered Lover
 A. J. M. Smith, editor, The Book of Canadian Poetry, anthology (see also editions of 1943, 1957)
 Arthur Stringer, New York Nocturnes. Toronto: Ryerson.

India, in English
 Bimal Chandra Bose, Gandhi-Gita ( Poetry in English ), Calcutta: Thacker, Spink and Co.
 Gurdial Mallik, Hound of the Heart ( Poetry in English ), Bombay: Naranda Publications
 Dilip Kumar Roy, Eyes of Light ( Poetry in English ), Bombay: Nalanda Publications
 Nanikram Vasanmal Thadani, He Walked Alone ( Poetry in English ), Delhi: Bharat Publishing House

United Kingdom
 Richard Aldington, Complete Poems
 Edward Andrade, He Likens Her to a Soldier
 Sir John Betjeman, Selected Poems
 Lilian Bowes Lyon, Collected Poems
 Lawrence Durrell, On Seeming to Presume
 T. S. Eliot, Notes Towards the Definition of Culture
 D. J. Enright, Season Ticket
 Robert Farren, The Course of Irish Verse in English, Irish criticism
 W. S. Graham, The Voyages of Alfred Wallis
 Robert Graves, The White Goddess, a "historical grammar" of poetic myth and inspiration
 John Heath-Stubbs, The Swarming of the Bees
 Hamish Henderson, Elegies for the Dead in Cyrenaica
 A. Norman Jeffares, W.B. Yeats: Man And Poet, United Kingdom, biography, revised in 1978
 Louis MacNeice, Holes in the Sky
 Norman Nicholson, Rock Face
 Vernon Scannell, Graves and Resurrections
 Sydney Goodsir Smith, Under the Eildon Tree: a poem in XXIV elegies
 Vernon Watkins, The Lady with the Unicorn

United States
 W. H. Auden, "In Praise of Limestone", a poem published in Horizon in July (written in May), later published in a collection in 1951 (native English poet living in the United States)
 John Berryman, The Dispossessed
 Richard Ellmann, Yeats, The Man And The Mask, United States, biography
 William Everson, The Residual Years, New Directions
 Langston Hughes, One-Way Ticket, Alfred A. Knopf
 Randall Jarrell, Losses
 Robinson Jeffers, The Double Axe and Other Poems, largely critical of U.S. policy, the book came with an extremely unconventional note from Random House that the views expressed by Jeffers were not those of the publisher; several influential literary critics disapproved of the book, with particularly scathing pieces penned by Yvor Winters and Kenneth Rexroth, who had previously commented favorably on Jeffers' work
 Archibald MacLeish, Actfive and Other Poems
 William Meredith, Ships and Other Figures
 Ezra Pound:
 The Pisan Cantos
 The Cantos of Ezra Pound
 Theodore Roethke, The Lost Son and Other Poems
 Muriel Rukeyser, The Green Wave
 May Sarton, The Lion and the Rose
 Wallace Stevens, A Primitive Like an Orb, Publisher: Gotham Book Mart
 Winfield Townley Scott, Mr. Whittier
 Mark Van Doren, New Poems
 Peter Viereck, Terror and Decorum
 William Carlos Williams:
 Paterson, Book II
 Clouds, Aigeltinger, Russia

Other in English
 James K. Baxter, Blow, Wind of Fruitfulness, New Zealand
 V. N. Bhusan, The Far Ascent, Bombay: Padma Pub.; India, Indian poetry in English
 Charles Brasch: Disputed Ground: Poems 1939-45, Christchurch: Caxton Press, New Zealand
 Robert Farren, The Course of Irish Verse in English, Irish criticism published in the United Kingdom
 Derek Walcott, 25 Poems

Works published in other languages
Listed by nation where the work was first published and again by the poet's native land, if different; substantially revised works listed separately:

France
 Louis Aragon, Le Nouveau Creve-Coeur
 André Breton, Poemes
 Aimé Césaire, Soleil cou coupé; Paris: K
 René Char, Fureur et mystere
 Paul Éluard, Corps mémorable
 Henri Michaux, La Vie dans les plis ("Life in the Folds")
 Saint-John Perse, Anabase, revised edition (first edition 1924)
 Jacques Prévert, Histoires
 Francis Ponge, Proêmes
 Raymond Queneau:
 L'Instant fatal
 Saint-Glinglin
 Georges Schéhadé, Hosties noires

India
In each section, listed in alphabetical order by first name:

Bengali
 Sukanta Bhattacharya, Chharpatra, posthumous
 Jibanananda Das, Satti Tarar Timur
 Mangalacharan Chattopadhyay, Telangana-O-Anyanya Kabita
 Premendra Mitra, Pherari Phauj
 Subhas Mukhopadhyay, Agnikon

Kannada
 Gangadhara Chittala, Kalada Kare, lyrics  on the theme of "time"
 M. Gopalakrishna Adiga, Kattuvevu, his first collection of lyrics
 S. G. Kulakarni, editor, Kannada kavya Bhandara, anthology of navodaya poets, including B. M. Shreekantayya, K. V. Puttappa, D. R. Bendre and D. V. Gundappa

Other languages on the Indian subcontinent
 Amrita Pritan, Lamian Vatan, Punjabi language
 Ananta Patnaik, Tarpana Kare Aji, poems on Gandhi, Oriya
 Asi, pen name of Abdul Bari, Rubaiyati Asi, Urdu
 Buddhidhari Singha, Amar Bapu, Maithili
 Harivans Rai Bacchan, Sut Ki Mala, 111 eleven poems on Gandhi and his ideology, Hindi
 Khumanthem Ibohal Singh, Nacome Lei ("Bouquet"), Manipuri
 Maheswar Neog, Sri Sri Sankaradeva, Assamese
 Mahjoor, Vava Subahuki, a political poem on the indignation of Kashmiris at delays in the United Nations Security Council concerning pleas to counter Pakistan's actions regarding that area; Kashmiri
 N. V. Krishna Varier, Ninta Kavitakal, long poems in Malayalam
 Nayaya vijaya Muni, Visva Vibhuti Svargaroha, a poem on Gandhi's death, Sanskrit
 Sumitranandan Pant, Visva Vibhuti Svargaroha, Hindi-language poems written in homage to Gandhi, Rabindranath Tagore and Sri Aurobindo
 Upendranath Jha, Sannyasi, a Kanda Kavya in blank verse, Maithili

Other languages
 García Baena, Mientras cantan los pájaros ("While Birds Sing"), Spain
 Aimé Césaire, Soleil cou coupé, Martinique author published in France
 Peter Huchel, Gedichte (Poems), East Germany
 Bohumil Hrabal, Ztracená ulička ("A Lost Alley"), Czechoslovakia
 Henryk Jasiczek, Rozmowy z ciszą ("Conversations with Silence"), Poland
 Olga Kirsch, Mure van die Hart, Afrikaans, South Africa
 Paul la Cour, Fragmenter af en Dagbog ("Fragments of a Diary"), Denmark
 Alexander Mezhirov, Kommunisty, vpered!, "Communists, Ahead!" poem reprinted in his second collection, New Encounters, and in many volumes, anthologies and samplers; Russia, Soviet Union
 Eugenio Montale, La fiera letteraria poetry criticism; Italy
 Nizar Qabbani, Childhood of a Breast, Syrian poet writing in Arabic
 Ole Wivel, I Fiskens Tegn ("In the Sign of the Fish"), Denmark

Awards and honors
 Nobel Prize in Literature: T. S. Eliot
 Consultant in Poetry to the Library of Congress (later the post would be called "Poet Laureate Consultant in Poetry to the Library of Congress"): Léonie Adams appointed this year.
 Pulitzer Prize for Poetry: W. H. Auden, The Age of Anxiety
 Fellowship of the Academy of American Poets: Percy MacKaye
 Canada: Governor General's Award, poetry or drama: The Rocking Chair and Other Poems, A. M. Klein
 North Carolina Poet Laureate: Arthur Talmage Abernethy (the first one to hold the office)

Births
Years link to the corresponding "[year] in poetry" article:
 January 22 – Timothy Steele, American poet and academic
 January 31 – Albert Goldbarth, American poet
 February 16 – Jeff Guess, Australian poet
 March 5 – Leslie Marmon Silko, Native American writer, a figure in the "Native American Renaissance"
 March 28 – Iman Budhi Santosa, Indonesian writer
 April 6 – Anna Couani, Australian poet and teacher
 May 13 – R. S. Gwynn, American poet and anthologist associated with New Formalism
 May 16 – Manglesh Dabral (died 2020), Indian Hindi poet and journalist
 May 24 – Lorna Crozier, Canadian poet
 May 29 – David Waltner-Toews, Canadian poet, writer and veterinary epidemiologist
 June 11 – David Lehman,  American poet and series editor for The Best American Poetry book series
 June 29 – John Ash, English-born poet and writer
 July 7 – Stephen Ratcliffe, American poet and publisher
 August 1 – Frank Stanford (died 1978), American poet
 August 20 – Heather McHugh, American poet
 September 9 – Sherod Santos, American poet and academic
 October 3 – Barrett Watten, American poet
 October 6 – Zakes Mda (Zanemvula Kizito Gatyeni Mda), South African novelist, poet and playwright
 October 7 – Diane Ackerman, American author, poet and naturalist
 October 9 – Ciaran Carson, Northern Irish poet and novelist
 October 18 – Ntozake Shange (pronounced En-toe-ZAHK-kay SHONG-gay) née Paulette Williams (died 2018), African-American playwright, performance artist, writer and poet
 November 14 – Kristina Lugn (died 2020), Swedish poet and dramatist
 November 29 – George Szirtes, Hungarian-born English poet and translator
 Also:
 Ali Al Shargawi (علي الشرقاوي), Bahraini poet
 Aung Cheint (died 2021), Burmese poet 
 Qassim Haddad, Bahraini free verse political poet
 Umar Bin Hassan, American poet
 Brian Henderson, Canadian poet and writer
 Bob Holman, American poet
 Lawrence Joseph, American poet, writer, essayist, critic, lawyer and law professor
 Yitzhak Laor (יצחק לאור), Israeli poet, author and journalist
 Denise Riley, English poet

Deaths
Years link to the corresponding "[year] in poetry" article:
 January 2 – Vicente Huidobro (born 1893), Chilean poet
 February 1 – Jatindramohan Bagchi (born 1878), Bengali poet
 May 22 – Claude McKay (born 1889), Jamaican-born American writer, humanist, Communist and part of the Harlem Renaissance
 March 14 – Senge Motomaro 千家元麿 (born 1888), Taishō and Shōwa period Japanese poet (surname: Senge)
 June 17 – Changampuzha Krishna Pillai (born 1911), Indian, Malayalam-language poet and translator
 August 25 – Gordon Bottomley (born 1874), English poet, known for his verse dramas
 August 31 – Andrei Zhdanov, 52 (born 1896), Soviet government official and persecutor of poets, writers and artists; until the late 1950s, Zhdanovism, defined cultural production in the Soviet Union; reducing permissible culture to a straightforward, scientific chart, where a given symbol corresponded to a simple moral value; Zhdanov and his associates further sought to eliminate foreign influence from Soviet art, proclaiming that "incorrect art" was an ideological diversion
 December 13 – Michael Roberts, 46 (born 1902), English poet, writer, critic and broadcaster and teacher

See also

 Poetry
 List of poetry awards
 List of years in poetry

Notes

20th-century poetry
Poetry